Mayu is a Japanese feminine given name. People with this name include:

People

Actresses
, Japanese actress
, Japanese pink film actress
, Japanese actress
, Japanese voice actress
, Japanese acress
, Japanese actress, ex-member of idol group AKB48

Singers
, Japanese singer-songwriter based in the United States

Sportspeople
, Japanese sprinter
, Japanese weightlifter
, Japanese artistic gymnast
, Japanese volleyball player
, Japanese professional wrestler
, Japanese taekwondo practitioner
, Japanese women's footballer
, Japanese badminton player
, Japanese sport wrestler
, Japanese women's footballer

Visual artists
, Japanese photojournalist and photo media artist based in Australia
, Japanese manga artist
, Japanese manga artist

Fictional characters
Mayu Amakura, a character from the Fatal Frame series
Mayu Hasuda, a character from the film Battle Royale II: Requiem
Mayu Tobita, a character from Kodocha
mayu, a character from the anime Selector Infected WIXOSS
MAYU, a voice in the software voice synthesiser Vocaloid 3
Mayu Suzumoto, a character from the anime Corpse Party
Mayu, a character from the anime Elfen Lied
Mayu, a character from the anime Space Pirate Captain Harlock
Mayu Tachibana, a character from Kamen Rider 1 (film)
Mayu Sakuma, a character from The Idolmaster Cinderella Girls

See also
Mayuko

Japanese feminine given names